Koryak Autonomous Okrug was a federal subject of Russia until June 30, 2007.  On July 1, 2007 it was merged with Kamchatka Oblast to form Kamchatka Krai.  After the merger, it retains a status of an administrative division within Kamchatka Krai.

Districts:
Karaginsky (Карагинский)
Urban-type settlements under the district's jurisdiction:
Ossora (Оссора)
Olyutorsky (Олюторский)
Penzhinsky (Пенжинский)
Tigilsky (Тигильский)
Urban-type settlements under the district's jurisdiction:
Palana (Палана) (administrative center)

See also
Administrative divisions of Kamchatka Oblast
Administrative divisions of Kamchatka Krai

References

Koryak
Koryak Autonomous Okrug, Divisions
Koryak Autonomous Okrug, Divisions
Koryak Autonomous Okrug, Divisions